Karl Borsch (born August 1, 1959 in Krefeld-Hüls) is auxiliary bishop of Aachen.

Born in Krefeld, he grew up in Kempen, where he also visited the gymnasium Thomaeum, where he graduated with abitur. 1979-1985 he studied law in Bonn. 1985-1990 he studied theology at the Philosophisch-Theologische Hochschule Sankt Georgen (Frankfurt) and in Freiburg.

On September 26, 1992 he was ordained a priest in Aachen, and worked as a chaplain in Hückelhoven until September 1996. From October 1, 1996 until March 31, 2002 he worked as the chaplain of the bishop and secretary. From October 2002 until March 2004 he was also director of the Collegium Leoninum seminary in Bonn.

On November 21, 2003 he was appointed as auxiliary bishop of Aachen and titular bishop of Crepedula. He was consecrated on  January 17, 2004 by Heinrich Mussinghoff in the Aachen Cathedral.

Coat of arms
The coat of arms of Karl Borsch is based on the coat of arms of the diocese of Aachen, a black cross on a golden shield. The inner red shield displays at top a deer antler, the symbol of Saint Hubertus, who is the patron saint of the home parish of Bishop Borsch in Kempen. Below is the cross of Saint Anthony the Great, whose feast day is on January 17, the day of the consecration of bishop Borsch.

The slogan of Bishop Borsch is Quaerite primum regnum Dei (But seek first the kingdom of God), taken from Gospel of Matthew (6:33).

See also
 Bishop of Aachen

Resources
 Biography at the Diocese of Aachen (German)

Sankt Georgen Graduate School of Philosophy and Theology alumni
German Roman Catholic titular bishops
1959 births
Living people
People from Krefeld
University of Bonn alumni
Auxiliary bishops